St. Kevin's Church opened in Harrington St., Dublin, in 1872 to serve the Roman Catholic parish of St. Kevin, which had been split from St. Catherine's in 1865. It was named after the nearby St. Kevin's church in Camden Row, which dated back to at least the 12th century, but which had become Protestant after the reformation.

In November 1903 a new organ was acquired and the grissille stained glass, the largest of its kind in Ireland, installed. The work was done by Earley and Company of nearby Camden St. Francis Hubert Earley, a sculptor of note, carved the St. Michael and St. Gabriel statues flanking the high altar at St. Kevin's.

The church is flanked by its Presbytery in Heytesbury Street and Synge Street CBS school in Synge St. Since 15 September 2007 it is the home of the Dublin Latin Mass Chaplaincy.

References

External references
Website

Churches of the Roman Catholic Archdiocese of Dublin
Roman Catholic churches in Dublin (city)